Kim Jeong-suk or Kim Jong-suk may refer to:
 Kim Jong-suk (1919–1949), spouse of North Korean national leader Kim Il-sung
 Kimjongsuk County
 Kim Jong-suk (politician) (born 1930)
 Kim Jung-sook (born 1954), former First Lady of South Korea
 Kim Jungsook (born 1946), women's rights activist

See also
 Kim (Korean surname), for other people with the same surname
 Jung-sook, for other people with the same given name